Continua Health Alliance is an international non-profit, open industry group of nearly 240 healthcare providers, communications, medical, and fitness device companies. 
Continua was a founding member of Personal Connected Health Alliance which was launches in February 2014 with other founding members mHealth SUMMIT and HIMSS.

Overview

Continua Health Alliance is an international not-for-profit industry organization enabling end-to-end, plug-and-play connectivity of devices and services for personal health management and healthcare delivery. Its mission is to empower information-driven health management and facilitate the incorporation of health and wellness into the day-to-day lives of consumers. ts activities include a certification and brand support program, events and collaborations to support technology and clinical innovation, as well as outreach to employers, payers, governments and care providers. With nearly 220 member companies reaching across the globe, Continua comprises technology, medical device and healthcare industry leaders and service providers dedicated to making personal connected health a reality.

Continua Health Alliance is working toward establishing systems of interoperable telehealth devices and services in three major categories: chronic disease management, aging independently, and health and physical fitness.

Devices and services

Continua Health Alliance version 1 design guidelines are based on proven connectivity technical standards and include Bluetooth for wireless and USB for wired device connection. The group released the guidelines to the public in June 2009.

The group is establishing a product certification program using its recognizable logo, the Continua Certified Logo program, signifying that the product is interoperable with other Continua-certified products. Products made under Continua Health Alliance guidelines will provide consumers with increased assurance of interoperability between devices, enabling them to more easily share information with caregivers and service providers.

Through collaborations with government agencies and other regulatory bodies, Continua works to provide guidelines for the effective management of diverse products and services from a global network of vendors. Continua Health Alliance products make use of the ISO/IEEE 11073 Personal Health Data (PHD) Standards.

Continua design guidelines are not available to the public without signing a Non-disclosure agreement. Continua's guidelines help technology developers build end-to-end, plug-and-play systems more efficiently and cost effectively.

Milestones

Continua Health Alliance was founded on June 6, 2006

Continua Health alliance performed its first public demonstration of interoperability on October 27, 2008 at the Partners Center for Connected Health 5th Annual Connected Health Symposium in Boston.

Continua Health Alliance certified its first product, the Nonin 2500 PalmSAT handheld pulse oximeter with USB, on January 26, 2009.

By the end of December 2014 there are more than 100 certified products.

Continua selected Bluetooth Low Energy and Zigbee wireless protocols as the wireless standards for its Version 2 Design Guidelines which have been released. Bluetooth Low Energy is to be used for low-power mobile devices. Zigbee will be used for networked low-power sensors such as those enabling independent living.

Beginning in 2012, Continua invites non-members to request a copy of its Design Guidelines after signing a non-disclosure agreement.

Continua has working groups and operations in the U.S., EU, Japan, India and China.

Members

Continua Health Alliance currently has nearly 220  member companies.

Continua's Board of Directors is currently composed of the following companies:

 Fujitsu
 Intel Corporation
 Oracle Corporation
 Orange
 Philips
 Qualcomm
 Roche Diagnostics
 Sharp
 UnitedHealth Group

Organisational structure

The organisation is primarily staffed by volunteers from the member organisations that are organised into working groups that address the goals of the alliance. Below the board of directors sit the following main working groups:

 Emerging Markets Working Group
 EU Working Group 
 Global Development and Outreach Working Group
 Marketing Council
 Market Adoption Working Group
 Regulatory Working Group
 Technical Working Group
 Test & Certification Work Group 
 Use Case Working Group
 U.S. Policy Working Group

Relevant standards 

 ISO/IEEE 11073
 ISO/IEEE 11073 Personal Health Data (PHD) Standards
 Bluetooth
 USB
 HL7
 Integrating the Healthcare Enterprise
 Zigbee

Website

The Continua Alliance website contains a full listing of member organisations, a directory of qualified products, and a clear statement of their mission.

See also
 Connected Health
 eHealth
 Telehealth
 Telemedicine
 Health 2.0

References

External links
 Continua Health Alliance website
 New Website: Personal Connected Health Alliance

Health informatics organizations
Interoperability
Telehealth